Mountains of Azerbaijan cover approximately 60 percent of the country's land area. There are three mountain ranges in the territory of Azerbaijan, which are the Greater Caucasus, the Lesser Caucasus, and the Talysh Mountains.

The elevation of the central mountains of these three mountain ranges is approximately 1000 – 2000 meters. The height of high mountains of the Greater Caucasus is higher than 2200 meters and the Lesser Caucasus is higher than 2000 meters. 

The Greater Caucasus range forms the north-east borders of Azerbaijan with Dagestan Autonomous Republic of Russia. Bazarduzu, Shahdagh, and Tufandag are the high peaks of the mountain range. The mountains of the Greater Caucasus are located in the region of high degree of seismic activity. The mountains are formed by rocks that date back to Jurassic and Cretaceous periods.

The Lesser Caucasus is the second important mountain range in Azerbaijan and forms its south-western borders. Mount Murovdag and Mount Zangezur are the main ridges of the Lesser Caucasus. They are formed by sedimentary and volcanogenic rocks of Cretaceous and Jurassic periods.

The Talysh Mountains cover the southeastern part of Azerbaijan and form part of its border with Iran.

Mountains of the Greater Caucasus

Bazarduzu 
The highest peak of the Greater Caucasus, Mount Bazarduzu, is the highest mountain in Azerbaijan. It lies on the borders between Azerbaijan and Russia. The rocks of Mount Bazarduzu are formed of shale porphyries. Ice fields that consist of glaciers from Ice Age on the mountain are the biggest glaciers in the Eastern Caucasus.

The first person who climbed the Mount Bazarduzu was Aleksej Aleksandrov from Russia in 1847.

Shahdagh 

The mountain is located near to the border with Russia, in Gusar region of Azerbaijan. There are caves at the base of the Mount Shahdagh, which show manmade activities around the mountain for over 9000 years. The rocks of the mountain are formed by dolomites and limestones.

Tufandag 

Mountains of Lesser Caucasus

Murovdag 
Within the Lesser Caucasus, the highest mountain ridge is Murovdag. The range of the mountain is approximately 70 kilometers.

Gamishdag 

The highest peak of the Murovdag ridge is Gamishdag and its elevation is 3724 meters.

Zangezur 
The Zangezur mountain ridge bordered with Aghdaban peak in north-west and Araz river in south-east. The range of the Zangezur ridge is approximately 130 kilometers. In the center and south-east parts of the ridge, there are Gamigaya, Kaputjukh, Garangush, Davabouynu, Aychingil peaks. Prominent mountains of the Zangezur ridge are Nahajir, Alinja, Ilandag, Gurddag, and Gizilboghaz mountains.

Kaputjukh 
Mount Kaputjukh is the highest peak of the Zangezur ridge and the highest mountain in the Lesser Caucasus. The height of the mountain is 3904 meters. It lies in Ordubad region of Nakhchivan. There are ancient Gamigaya inscriptions on the rocks that are at the bottom of the mountain.

Alinja 

Mount Alinja is located in Julfa region of Nakhchivan, on the shore of the river with the same name as mountain. The elevation of Mount Alinja is 1811 meters. It has volcanic origins.

Talysh Mountains 

Talysh mountains are located in the south – east of Azerbaijan.  There are three mountain ridge within the Talysh mountains, which of elevations reach 2477 meters. They are Talysh, Burovar, and Peshteser. There are few peaks that of heights are above . The rocks of the mountains originated from volcanic rocks and carbonate rocks that date back to the Jurassic, Cretaceous, and Paleogene periods.

Kyumyurkyoy 
The highest peak of Talysh mountains is the Mount Kyumyurkyoy (2493 meters).

Gizyurdu 
Mount Gizyurdu is the second highest peak of Talysh mountains with the height of 2433 meters.

Other mountains

Mount Goyazan 
The elevation of Mount Goyazan is located 20 kilometers far from Qazakh district of Azerbaijan. Its elevation is 250 meters. The mountain has volcanic origin and it is not connected to any mountain ridges. At the bottom of the mountain, there are ancient dwellings.

Yanar Dag 
Yanar Dag is located 27 kilometers far from Baku. On the surface of Yanar Dag, there are fires of natural gas that flames continuously, and their height reaches to 10–15 meters.

The historical-cultural and natural reserve was established in the territory of Yanar Dag by the presidential decree dated May 2, 2007.

Gallery

See also 
Geography of Azerbaijan

References

External links 
Ministry of Ecology and Natural Resources of Azerbaijan Republic

 
Geography of Azerbaijan
Azerbaijan
Azerbaijan
Azerbaijan